Walter Greenhill (19 June 1849 – 29 June 1913) was an English cricketer.  Greenhill was a right-handed batsman.  He was born at St John's Wood, London.

Greenhill made two first-class appearances for Sussex, both against Surrey in 1868.  In the first match against Surrey at The Oval, Greenhill scored 15 runs before being dismissed by John Bristow, while in their second-innings he was dismissed by Tom Sewell for 3 runs.  Surrey won the match by 7 wickets.  In the second match at the Royal Brunswick Ground, Hove, he was dismissed for 2 runs in Sussex's first-innings by James Street, while in their second-innings he was dismissed for 4 runs by George Griffith.  Surrey won the match by 9 wickets.

He died at Warsash, Hampshire on 29 June 1913.

References

External links
Walter Greenhill at ESPNcricinfo
Walter Greenhill at CricketArchive

1849 births
1913 deaths
People from St John's Wood
English cricketers
Sussex cricketers